

Mike Cafarella is a computer scientist specializing in database management systems. He is an associate professor of computer science at University of Michigan. Along with Doug Cutting, he is one of the original co-founders of the Hadoop and Nutch open-source projects. Cafarella was born in New York City but moved to Westwood, MA early in his childhood. After completing his bachelor's degree at Brown University, he earned a Ph.D. specializing in database management systems at the University of Washington under Dan Suciu and Oren Etzioni. He was also involved in several notable start-ups, including Tellme Networks, and co-founder of Lattice Data, which was acquired by Apple in 2017.

Education

 Ph.D., Computer Science, June 2009. University of Washington.
 M.Sc., Computer Science, 2005. University of Washington.
 M.Sc., Artificial Intelligence, 1997. University of Edinburgh.
 B.S., Computer Science, 1996. Brown University.

References

External links
 Personal web page
 Michigan Database Group home page

Living people
American computer scientists
Database researchers
University of Washington College of Engineering alumni
Brown University alumni
University of Michigan faculty
Year of birth missing (living people)